Kentavious Tannell Caldwell-Pope (born February 18, 1993) is an American professional basketball player for the Denver Nuggets of the National Basketball Association (NBA). He was named a McDonald's All-American as one of the top high school basketball players in the class of 2011. He played college basketball for two years with the Georgia Bulldogs in the Southeastern Conference (SEC), and was voted the SEC Player of the Year as a sophomore in 2013.

Caldwell-Pope was selected with the eighth overall pick in the 2013 NBA draft by the Detroit Pistons. He played four seasons with the Pistons before joining the Lakers as a free agent in 2017–18. He won his first NBA championship with the Lakers in 2020. He spent a season with the Washington Wizards after having been traded there from the Lakers in August 2021, and was then subsequently traded to the Denver Nuggets in July 2022.

High school career
Caldwell-Pope was a highly heralded player in high school. As a senior, he averaged 31 points and 8.2 rebounds per game at Greenville High School in Greenville, Georgia. He led the Patriots to the State Class A Final Four in 2011 and to consecutive Sweet 16 berths in 2009–10.

He was named to several prominent high school All-America teams as a senior, including being selected to play in the 2011 McDonald's All-American Game and the Jordan Brand Classic.

As a senior, he was rated the nation's No. 3 shooting guard prospect, the No. 12 prospect overall, by recruiting analysts for Rivals.com.

Caldwell-Pope chose Georgia to play for Mark Fox and Cody Anderson over scholarship offers from Alabama, Florida State, Georgia Tech, and Tennessee among others.

College career 
As a freshman, Caldwell-Pope was named to the Coaches' Freshman All-SEC Team, which also included NBA lottery picks Bradley Beal, Anthony Davis, and Michael Kidd-Gilchrist. His highest output as a freshman was 25 points against Ole Miss, which was the most by a UGA freshman in almost 13 years.
As a sophomore, Caldwell-Pope was named SEC Player of the Year after averaging 18.5 points and 7.1 rebounds per game. In his final collegiate game, he scored a career-high 32 points and 13 rebounds in a loss against LSU at the SEC tournament in Nashville. He declared for the NBA draft after the season.

Professional career

Detroit Pistons (2013–2017) 

On June 27, 2013, Caldwell-Pope was selected with the eighth overall pick in the 2013 NBA draft by the Detroit Pistons. He later joined the Pistons for the 2013 NBA Summer League and signed his rookie scale contract with the team on July 19. On April 16, 2014, he scored a then-career-high 30 points in a loss to the Oklahoma City Thunder.

In July 2014, Caldwell-Pope rejoined the Pistons for the 2014 NBA Summer League, where he averaged 24.0 points and 7.4 rebounds in five games. Head coach Stan Van Gundy quickly assessed Caldwell-Pope as his best perimeter defender and he wound up leading the Pistons in minutes played with 2,587. Caldwell-Pope got better after the All-Star break, largely thanks to the acquisition of point guard Reggie Jackson; post All-Star Break, Caldwell-Pope averaged 14.3 points per game. He finished the season with 153 three-point shots made, 70 more than the closest Pistons player. He tied Kevin Love for 16th in the NBA.

On December 16, 2015, Caldwell-Pope scored a then career-high 31 points in a 119–116 win over the Boston Celtics. He helped the Pistons finish the 2015–16 regular season with a 44–38 record, which was good for the eighth seed in the Eastern Conference. The Pistons thus qualified for the playoffs for the first time since 2009. In the first round of the playoffs, the Pistons faced the first-seeded Cleveland Cavaliers, and in a Game 1 loss on April 17, Caldwell-Pope scored a team-high 21 points. The Pistons went on to lose the series 4–0.

On November 9, 2016, Caldwell-Pope scored a then season-high 27 points in a 107–100 loss to the Phoenix Suns. On November 25, 2016, he recorded 16 points and a career-high 10 assists in a 108–97 win over the Los Angeles Clippers. On January 8, 2017, he hit a three-pointer with 9.4 seconds left in double overtime to lead the Pistons to a 125–124 win over the Portland Trail Blazers; he finished with 26 points. On February 1, 2017, he scored a career-high 38 points in a 118–98 win over the New Orleans Pelicans. He also made a career-high eight three-pointers on 11 attempts. On February 23, 2017, Caldwell-Pope scored 33 points, including three three-pointers late in the fourth quarter during a Detroit rally, as the Pistons defeated the Charlotte Hornets 114–108 in overtime. Caldwell-Pope's three-pointer with 18.2 seconds to play tied the game at 100.

On June 23, 2017, Caldwell-Pope was suspended for two games without pay by the NBA for pleading guilty to operating a motor vehicle while intoxicated.

On July 7, 2017, the Pistons renounced the rights to Caldwell-Pope, making him an unrestricted free agent.

Los Angeles Lakers (2017–2021)
On July 13, 2017, Caldwell-Pope signed a one-year, $18 million contract with the Los Angeles Lakers. He made his debut for the Lakers on October 22, 2017, scoring 20 points as a starter in a 119–112 loss to the New Orleans Pelicans. On November 27, 2017, he scored a season-high 29 points against the Los Angeles Clippers. On December 13, 2017, Caldwell-Pope pleaded guilty to a probation violation he committed during the summer. He was handed a 25-day jail sentence, but under a work-release program, was allowed to leave the facility for home games and practices. He was not allowed to leave California, limiting him to only home games within the state during that period. On February 24, 2018, he scored a season-high 34 points and hit a career-high-tying eight 3-pointers in a 113–108 win over the Sacramento Kings. On March 22, 2018, he hit eight 3-pointers and had 28 points in a 128–125 loss to the New Orleans Pelicans.

On July 6, 2018, Caldwell-Pope re-signed with the Lakers, on a reported one-year, $12 million contract. On December 16, 2018, he scored a season-high 25 points in a 128–110 loss to the Washington Wizards. On December 30, he set a new season high with 26 points in a 121–114 win over the Kings. On March 19, he had a season-high 35 points in a 115–101 loss to the Milwaukee Bucks.

In 2019, Caldwell-Pope re-signed with the Lakers once again, this time on a two-year contract worth roughly $16 million. In 2019–20, he made a career-high 38.5% of his 3-pointers and was third on the team with 92 made 3-pointers. Caldwell-Pope won his first NBA championship when the Lakers defeated the Miami Heat in six games in the 2020 NBA Finals. He was instrumental in the victory, especially in game 4 when his five straight points late in the fourth quarter helped the Lakers pull away from the Heat and sealed the win in that game. He started all 21 games in the playoffs, averaging 10.7 points in 29 minutes per game and making 37.8% of his 3-pointers.

Caldwell-Pope declined his player option on the second year of his contract and became a free agent. On November 23, 2020, he re-signed with the Lakers on a three-year, $40 million deal.

Washington Wizards (2021–2022)
On August 6, 2021, Caldwell-Pope was traded to the Washington Wizards as part of a package for Russell Westbrook. In 77 games with the team, he averaged 13.2 points, 3.4 rebounds, and 1.9 assists per game.

Denver Nuggets (2022–present)
On July 6, 2022, Caldwell-Pope was traded, alongside Ish Smith, to the Denver Nuggets in exchange for Monté Morris and Will Barton. On July 16, Caldwell-Pope signed a two-year, $30 million contract extension with the Nuggets. He made his Nuggets debut on October 19, recording two points, four rebounds, six assists and two steals in a 123–102 loss to the Utah Jazz.

Career statistics

NBA

Regular season

|-
| style="text-align:left;"| 
| style="text-align:left;"| Detroit
| 80 || 41 || 19.8 || .396 || .319 || .770 || 2.0 || .7 || .9 || .2 || 5.9
|-
| style="text-align:left;"| 
| style="text-align:left;"| Detroit
| 82 || 82 || 31.5 || .401 || .345 || .696 || 3.1 || 1.3 || 1.1 || .2 || 12.7
|-
| style="text-align:left;"| 
| style="text-align:left;"| Detroit
| 76 || 76 || 36.7 || .420 || .309 || .811 || 3.7 || 1.8 || 1.4 || .2 || 14.5
|-
| style="text-align:left;"| 
| style="text-align:left;"| Detroit
| 76 || 75 || 33.3 || .399 || .350 || .832 || 3.3 || 2.5 || 1.2 || .2 || 13.8
|-
| style="text-align:left;"| 
| style="text-align:left;"| L.A. Lakers
| 74 || 74 || 33.2 || .426 || .383 || .789 || 5.2 || 2.2 || 1.4 || .2 || 13.4
|-
| style="text-align:left;"| 
| style="text-align:left;"| L.A. Lakers
| style="background:#cfecec;"|  82* || 23 || 24.8 || .430 || .347 || .867 || 2.9 || 1.3 || .9 || .2 || 11.4
|-
| style="text-align:left;background:#afe6ba;"| 
| style="text-align:left;"| L.A. Lakers
| 69 || 26 || 25.5 || .467 || .385 || .775 || 2.1 || 1.6 || .8 || .2 || 9.3
|-
| style="text-align:left;"| 
| style="text-align:left;"| L.A. Lakers
| 67 || 67 || 28.4 || .431 || .410 || .866 || 2.7 || 1.9 || .9 || .4 || 9.7
|-
| style="text-align:left;"| 
| style="text-align:left;"| Washington
| 77 || 77 || 30.2 || .435 || .390 || .890 || 3.4 || 1.9 || 1.1 || .3 || 13.2
|-
| style="text-align:center;" colspan="2"| Career
| 683 || 541 || 29.2 || .421 || .360 || .813 || 3.1 || 1.7 || 1.1 || .2 || 11.6

Playoffs

|-
| style="text-align:left;"| 2016
| style="text-align:left;"| Detroit
| 4 || 4 || 40.3 || .440 || .444 || .714 || 4.3 || 2.8 || 1.8 || .3|| 15.3
|-
| style="text-align:left;background:#afe6ba;"| 2020
| style="text-align:left;"| L.A. Lakers
| style="background:#cfecec;"|  21* || style="background:#cfecec;"|  21* || 29.0 || .418 || .378 || .815 || 2.1 || 1.3 || 1.0 || .2 || 10.7
|-
| style="text-align:left;"| 2021
| style="text-align:left;"| L.A. Lakers
| 5 || 5 || 29.2 || .379 || .211 || 1.000 || 2.8 || 1.0 || 1.0 || .0 || 6.2
|- class="sortbottom"
| style="text-align:center;" colspan="2"| Career
| 30 || 30 || 30.5 || .418 || .370 || .821 || 3.5 || 1.5 || 1.1 || .2 || 10.6

College

|-
| style="text-align:left;"| 2011–12
| style="text-align:left;"| Georgia
| 32 || 32 || 32.1 || .396 || .304 || .654 || 5.2 || 1.2 || 1.8 || .3 || 13.2
|-
| style="text-align:left;"| 2012–13
| style="text-align:left;"| Georgia
| 32 || 32 || 33.9 || .433 || .373 || .799 || 7.1 || 1.8 || 2.0 || .5 || 18.5
|- class="sortbottom"
| style="text-align:center;" colspan="2"| Career
| 64 || 64 || 33.0 || .415 || .339 || .727 || 6.2 || 1.5 || 1.9 || .4 || 15.9

Personal life
In June 2016, Caldwell-Pope married partner McKenzie Redmon.

References

External links

Georgia Bulldogs bio

1993 births
Living people
21st-century African-American sportspeople
African-American basketball players
American men's basketball players
Basketball players from Georgia (U.S. state)
Denver Nuggets players
Detroit Pistons draft picks
Detroit Pistons players
Georgia Bulldogs basketball players
Los Angeles Lakers players
McDonald's High School All-Americans
People from Greenville, Georgia
People from Thomaston, Georgia
Shooting guards
Sportspeople from the Atlanta metropolitan area
Washington Wizards players